The Jacksons Live! (a.k.a. Live) is a live album by The Jacksons. It was released on November 11, 1981 by Epic Records. The album was recorded during the band's North American concert tour in fall 1981, known as the Triumph Tour. The live double album was culled from recordings made on the tour's stops in Buffalo, Providence, Atlanta, and New York City. The live album would go on to sell over two million copies worldwide.

The 1981 live show setlist featured songs from the group's 1980 album Triumph, two songs from Destiny (1978), a medley of their Motown hits, and five songs from lead singer Michael's 1979 solo album Off the Wall.

The Triumph Tour would be the group's last tour together for three years, while Michael recorded and released the phenomenally successful Thriller (1982) album and its singles in 1982 and 1983. The group would reunite for their final tour (sans an injured Jackie Jackson, who only participated in the second and final last leg of the tour after recovering from a knee injury) — Victory Tour — in 1984. In 1988, Rolling Stone magazine described the Triumph Tour as one of the best 25 tours between 1967 and 1987.

Reception
Bruce Eder, of AllMusic, wrote that the album "is a reminder of how great an act they (the Jacksons) were, and captures what was just about the end of Michael Jackson's work with the family group, all of it very much on a high-note.  The album is worth tracking down as an artifact of a simpler, more unabashedly joyous time in music, as well as the family's history."

Track listing

Personnel
The Jacksons
Michael Jackson – vocals
Jackie Jackson – vocals, percussion
Tito Jackson – guitar, vocals
Marlon Jackson – vocals, percussion 
Randy Jackson – vocals, congas, percussions, piano, keyboards

Additional musicians
David Williams – guitar
Bill Wolfer – keyboards
Mike McKinney – bass
Jonathan Moffett – drums
East Coast Horns: Alan "Funt" Prater, Broderick "Mac" McMorris, Cloris Grimes, Wesley Phillips – horns

Technical
Bill Schnee – recording, mixing
Lynn Goldsmith, Todd Gray – photography

Charts

Certifications

References

External links 
 The Jacksons - Live (1981) album releases & credits at Discogs

1981 live albums
The Jackson 5 live albums
Epic Records live albums